Cobham Park may refer to:
 Cobham Park, a country house in Surrey, England, now converted to apartments
 Cobham Park (cricket ground), in Kent, England
 Cobham Park (Virginia), a historic estate in Virginia, United States
 Cobham Park, Virginia, an unincorporated community